Near North Side or Near Northside can refer to:

Near North Side, Chicago
Near Northside, Houston
Near North Side, Omaha

See also
Near North (disambiguation)
Near East Side (disambiguation)
Near South Side (disambiguation)
Near West Side (disambiguation)